The Christ the King statue (Portuguese: Cristo Rei) is a Catholic monument and shrine overlooking the city of Lubango in the South of Angola. It was inspired by the Christ the Redeemer statue in Rio de Janeiro (Brazil), as one of only four in the world. This  white marble statue was built in 1957.

The monument was designed in the 1950s by Portuguese engineer of Madeira Frazão Sardinha, and is listed as an Angolan World Heritage Site as of April 18, 2014.

History
The statue was built in 1957, by the ancient settlers of the region of Madeira (Portugal). It was built as a Catholic landmark, but represented colonial interests in various Portuguese countries during the colonial period.

Architecture
Built on a base of cement and hydraulic lime, at an altitude of two thousand 130 meters above sea level, the monument rests on a foundation of stones, cement and bricks, with two levels to support a ladder to the last, which is more practical view the statue.

See also
 List of statues of Jesus

References

Colossal statues of Jesus